Caroline Kraabel (born 1961 in Torrance, California) is an American saxophonist.

Career
After living in Seattle, Kraabel moved to London while in her teenage years. She started playing saxophone and became active in London's improvised music scene, developing a style based on extended techniques and acoustics. She performed solo and with John Edwards, Veryan Weston, Charlotte Hug, Maggie Nicols, Phil Hargreaves, and the London Improvisors Orchestra. She organized and conducted pieces for Mass Producers , a 20-piece, all-female saxophone/voice orchestra and for Saxophone Experimentals in Space, a 55-piece group of young saxophonists. Kraabel hosted a weekly radio show on Resonance FM and is the editor for the London Musicians Collective's magazine Resonance.

Albums include Transitions with Maggie Nichols and Charlotte Hug, Five Shadows with Veryan Weston, Performances for Large Saxophone Ensemble 1 and 2 and Performances for Large Saxophone Ensemble 3 and 4 with Mass Producers, and the solo work Now We Are One Two.

References

External links

 

American women composers
21st-century American composers
American expatriates in the United Kingdom
British radio presenters
Musicians from Seattle
Living people
1961 births
21st-century American saxophonists
21st-century American women musicians
British women radio presenters
21st-century women composers
Women saxophonists
Emanem Records artists